Brahmarakshasa may refer to:

 Brahmarakshasa, fierce demon spirits in Hindu mythology
 Brahma Rakshass, 1990 Indian Malayalam film, directed by Vijayan Karote
 Brahmarakshas (TV series), 2016 Indian Hindi supernatural TV series